Tiina Puumalainen (born 1966) is a Finnish theatre director and a playwright. 
She has directed drama, opera and musicals for the stage.

Education:
Master of Arts in directing, Helsinki Theatre Academy 1995-1999

Coming up next:
 Contemporary drama (premiere August 31, 2018) and classic (premiere January 2019) for Tampereen Työväen Teatteri

Selected latest works 

 2017 Andrew Lloyd Webber, Charles Hart & Richard Stilgoe: The Phantom of the Opera, Göteborgsoperan
 2017 Karl Müller-Berghaus: Die Kalewainen in Pochjola (opera), Turku Music Festival
 2017 Tuomas Kyrö: The Grump's Finland (drama), Tampereen Työväen Teatteri
 2016 Joe Masteroff, Fred Ebb & John Kander: Cabaret (musical), Tampereen Työväen Teatteri
 2015 Arturo Pérez-Reverte: Tango de la Guardia Vieja (drama & dance). Tampereen Työväen Teatteri
 2015 Andrew Lloyd Webber, Charles Hart & Richard Stilgoe: The Phantom of the Opera, Finnish National Opera
 2015 Orvokki Autio: Valokuvavarkaat (drama), Tampereen Työväen Teatteri
 2014 Andrew Lloyd Webber - Tim Rice: Evita (musical), Tampereen Työväen Teatteri
 2013 Marshall Brickman - Rick Elice - Andrew Lippa: The Addams Family (musical), additional credits: translation (dialogue), Tampereen Työväen Teatteri
 2013 Prosper Mérimée - Puumalainen: Carmen (drama & dance), additional credits: script, Tampereen Työväen Teatteri
 2012 Sofi Oksanen - Jüri Reinvere: Purge (opera), Finnish National Opera
 2012 Joseph Conrad - Puumalainen: Heart of Darkness (drama), additional credits: script, Tampereen Työväen Teatteri
 2011 Aino Kallas: The Wolf's Bride (drama & dance), Tampereen Työväen Teatteri 
 2011 Mika Waltari: Gabriel, tule takaisin! (drama), Tampereen Työväen Teatteri 
 2010 Ingmar Bergman: Fanny and Alexander (drama), Tampereen Työväen Teatteri 
 2010 John Kander - Fred Ebb - Bob Fosse: Chicago (musical), Tampereen Työväen Teatteri 
 2009 Puumalainen: Laulu Suomelle (television / drama), additional credits: script, Yle / drama (TV for the Finnish Broadcasting Company)

Additional works 

Libretto: Pohjanmaan kautta / The Bootleggers, Ilmajoki Opera   2003 & 2004
Play: Isyyspakkaus / Daddy's manual, Alexander's Theatre Helsinki 2012
Script editor / writer / director also for several independent productions

Puumalainen was the theatre manager of Seinäjoki City Theatre  for 1999-2001 and the artistic manager of Alexander's Theatre 2005-2012.

Awards 

The Order of the Lion of Finland, knight first class, 2009

References 

1966 births
Living people